Maletino is a rural locality (a selo) in Stolbovsky Selsoviet, Kamensky District, Altai Krai, Russia. The population was 68 as of 2013. There are 2 streets.

Geography 
Maletino is located 41 km north of Kamen-na-Obi (the district's administrative centre) by road. Klyuchi is the nearest rural locality.

References 

Rural localities in Kamensky District, Altai Krai